is a Japanese former figure skater. She is the 2015 Skate Canada International bronze medalist and 2016 Bavarian Open champion. She has finished in the top ten at two ISU Championships.

Career

Early career 
Nagai finished 18th at the 2012 Japanese Junior Championships. Her international debut came at the start of the 2012–13 season, at the 2012 Asian Trophy. She placed 7th at her ISU Junior Grand Prix (JGP) event in Austria, and 18th at the Japanese Junior Championships. 

In 2013–14, Nagai finished 8th at her JGP event in Latvia and 19th at the Japanese Junior Championships.

2014–15 season 
During the 2014–15 JGP series, Nagai won silver medals in Ljubljana, Slovenia and Nagoya, Japan. Her results qualified her for the Junior Grand Prix Final, held in December 2014 in Barcelona, Spain, where she placed 5th.

Nagai placed 4th at the 2015 Japanese Championships and won the bronze medal at the junior event, finishing behind Wakaba Higuchi and Kaori Sakamoto. She was selected to compete at the 2015 Four Continents where she placed 6th in her senior international debut. 
She closed her season by finishing 7th at the 2015 World Junior Championships.

2015–16 season 
Nagai started her season on the ISU Challenger Series (CS), placing 6th at the 2015 Ondrej Nepela Trophy. 

Making her debut on the senior level of the ISU Grand Prix, Nagai won bronze at 2015 Skate Canada International.

Programs

Competitive highlights 
GP: Grand Prix; CS: Challenger Series; JGP: Junior Grand Prix

Detailed results

Senior

Junior

References

External links 

 

1998 births
Japanese female single skaters
Living people
Sportspeople from Tokyo